Legends of Jazz with Ramsey Lewis was a 13-week, public television show, produced by the Chicago-based independent music entertainment company, LRSmedia and distributed by WTTW. It was first broadcast on  public television stations in April 2006. The series was the first weekly network television jazz show in 40 years. The show was purchased by Savage Content on July 26, 2021.

Each themed episode featured intimate conversations and original performances by some of the world's leading musicians.  Grammy Award-winning composer/pianist Ramsey Lewis hosted the series, which was produced in multi-camera HDTV and lossless Dolby Surround 5.1 audio.

Episodes and guests
The Golden Horns - Clark Terry, Roy Hargrove, Chris Botti
The Jazz Singers - Al Jarreau, Kurt Elling
The Great Guitars - Pat Metheny, Jim Hall
Contemporary Jazz - George Duke, Lee Ritenour, Marcus Miller
The Altos - David Sanborn, Phil Woods
The Piano Masters - Dave Brubeck, Dr. Billy Taylor
Roots: The Blues - Robert Cray, Keb' Mo'
American Songbook - Jane Monheit, John Pizzarelli
Latin Jazz - Eddie Palmieri, Dave Valentin
The Tenors - Benny Golson, Chris Potter, Marcus Strickland
Brazilian Jazz - Ivan Lins, Oscar Castro-Neves
The Killer Bs - Joey DeFrancesco, Dr. Lonnie Smith
NEA Jazz Masters 2006 - Tony Bennett, Chick Corea, Ray Barretto

References

External links
Internet Archive of Legends of Jazz official Web site

LRSmedia.net
Ramsey Lewis' Official Site

PBS original programming